Uno is an unincorporated community in Wyoming County, West Virginia, United States.

Uno was so named on account of the name's brevity.

References

Unincorporated communities in Wyoming County, West Virginia
Unincorporated communities in West Virginia